Antics may refer to:

Computing 
 Antics 2-D Animation, a general-purpose animation and graphics software system for MS Windows
 Antics Technologies, a software company based in Cambridge, England
 Antics3D, a rapid 3d animation software tool, reported as no longer available from November 2008
 The Birds and the Bees II: Antics, a 1983 video game released for the Commodore 64 and ZX Spectrum
 ANTIC, or Alpha-Numeric Television Interface Circuit, an early video system chip used in Atari microcomputers

Other media 
 Antics (album), a 2004 album by Interpol
 The Antics, an improvisational comedy troupe from Sheffield, England
 Antics, a 2013 Album released by Indie rock band Vundabar

See also

 Antic (disambiguation)
 Antique (disambiguation)
 Antix (disambiguation)
 Shenanigans (disambiguation)